Sattley, formerly known as Church's Corners, is a census-designated place in Sierra County, California, United States. Sattley is located on California State Route 49 and California State Route 89 southwest of Loyalton. According to the Sattley-Sierraville community association, it was named after resident Harriet Sattley Church. The community board also states that the town was founded in 1881 by Eric Amen, a wealthy prospector. The post office in Sattley opened in 1884.

Geography
According to the United States Census Bureau, the CDP covers an area of 2.0 square miles (5.3 km), 99.91% of it land and 0.09% of it water

Demographics
The 2010 United States Census reported that Sattley had a population of 49. The population density was 23.9 people per square mile (9.2/km). The racial makeup of Sattley was 48 (98.0%) White, 0 (0.0%) African American, 1 (2.0%) Native American, 0 (0.0%) Asian, 0 (0.0%) Pacific Islander, 0 (0.0%) from other races, and 0 (0.0%) from two or more races.  Hispanic or Latino of any race were 1 persons (2.0%).

The Census reported that 49 people (100% of the population) lived in households, 0 (0%) lived in non-institutionalized group quarters, and 0 (0%) were institutionalized.

There were 25 households, out of which 4 (16.0%) had children under the age of 18 living in them, 10 (40.0%) were opposite-sex married couples living together, 4 (16.0%) had a female householder with no husband present, 0 (0%) had a male householder with no wife present.  There were 0 (0%) unmarried opposite-sex partnerships, and 0 (0%) same-sex married couples or partnerships. 11 households (44.0%) were made up of individuals, and 3 (12.0%) had someone living alone who was 65 years of age or older. The average household size was 1.96.  There were 14 families (56.0% of all households); the average family size was 2.71.

The population was spread out, with 9 people (18.4%) under the age of 18, 2 people (4.1%) aged 18 to 24, 11 people (22.4%) aged 25 to 44, 22 people (44.9%) aged 45 to 64, and 5 people (10.2%) who were 65 years of age or older.  The median age was 48.8 years. For every 100 females, there were 88.5 males.  For every 100 females age 18 and over, there were 90.5 males.

There were 34 housing units at an average density of 16.6 per square mile (6.4/km), of which 15 (60.0%) were owner-occupied, and 10 (40.0%) were occupied by renters. The homeowner vacancy rate was 6.3%; the rental vacancy rate was 0%.  32 people (65.3% of the population) lived in owner-occupied housing units and 17 people (34.7%) lived in rental housing units.

Politics

References

Census-designated places in Sierra County, California
Census-designated places in California